Fairmont Municipal Airport , also known as Frankman Field, is a public use airport located two nautical miles (4 km) southwest of the central business district of Fairmont, a city in Marion County, West Virginia, United States. It is owned by the Fairmont-Marion County Regional Airport Authority. This airport is included in the National Plan of Integrated Airport Systems for 2011–2015, which categorized it as a general aviation facility.

Facilities and aircraft 
Fairmont Municipal Airport covers an area of 20 acres (8 ha) at an elevation of 1,029 feet (314 m) above mean sea level. It has one runway designated 5/23 with an asphalt surface measuring 2,965 by 75 feet (904 x 23 m).

For the 12-month period ending July 2, 2008, the airport had 7,900 aircraft operations, an average of 21 per day: 94% general aviation and 6% military. At that time there were 30 aircraft based at this airport: 90% single-engine and 10% multi-engine.

References

External links 
 Aerial image as of April 1997 from USGS The National Map
 
 

Airports in West Virginia
Marion County, West Virginia

de:Fairmont Municipal Airport